Laura Chislett, also known as Laura Chislett Jones, is an Australian flute player, known for performing contemporary repertoire such as Brian Ferneyhough's Unity Capsule, James Dillon's Sgothan, Michael Finnissy's Sikangnuqa, Reza Vali's flute solo, entitled, Song, Maurice Weddington's Deovolente, and neglected 20th-century repertoire such as works by Lili Boulanger, Willem Pijper, Augusta Holmès, and Jean Binet.

Her performances include recitals and/or masterclasses in Australia, Ireland, Sweden, the Netherlands, Italy, Switzerland, Luxemburg, Thailand, China and the USA. She has performed as a guest soloist with orchestra/ensemble at major festivals, including the Huddersfield Contemporary Music Festival, the Sydney Spring Festival, Insel Musik Berlin, the Pittsburgh International Music Festival and with the Australian Chamber Orchestra performing Michael Smetanin's flute concerto, Shakhmat/Supremat.

Recordings

Solo or duo
The Flute Ascendant... (VAST 007-2) 1992, Vox Australis
Chris Dench: Music for Flute (ETC 1146) 1993, Etcetera Records, Holland
Flute Impressions with David Miller, piano, (WAL 8018-2 CD) 1994, Walsingham Classics
The Flute in Orbit with Stephanie McCallum, piano, (ABC 446 738-2) 1995, ABC Classics
Flute Vox 2015 with Stephanie McCallum, piano, ABC Commercial

Ensemble
Kraanerg by Iannis Xenakis (KTC 1075) Etcetera Records, conducted by Roger Woodward
Strange Attractions, Sydney Alpha Ensemble (ABC 4565372) 1997 ABC Classics
Against the Wind, original soundtrack by Jon English and Mario Millo, Redmoon Music RED06-009

Single tracks
Chris Dench: Sulle scale della Fenice on Perspectives of New Music (PNM 29) 1991, USA
Richard Karpen: Exchange for flute and tape, Le Chant du monde, cultures electroniques/2, 1987, France
Chris Dench: De/ploye and Phillipe Durville: After Effect on Fonit Cetra (CDC 45) 1989, Italy
Jane O'Leary: Duo for Alto Flute and Guitar, with John Feeley, Overture Music 30, Ireland, 2010
Katia Tiutiunnik: Duo for flute and piano, The Quickening, with Australian pianist Stephanie McCallum, re-released on the Australian Broadcasting Corporation, ABC Classics album, Women of Note: A Century of Australian Composers Volume 2, Australia, 2020

References

Further reading 
 "A Performer's Notebook" in Perspectives of New Music, no. 29B
 "Review: Flute Impressions: Romantic Music for Flute and Piano. Laura Chislett, flute; David Miller, piano", Fanfare, July/August 1995, USA
 "Review: The Flute Ascendant", Fanfare, p. 99, May 1993, USA

External links 
Flute Vox, Australian Music Centre
"Review of Flute Vox", Limelight
"Reviews of Flute Vox, from Fanfare, USA July/August 2016

Australian classical flautists
Living people
Women flautists
Year of birth missing (living people)